Günther Adolf Ferdinand von Kluge (30 October 1882 – 19 August 1944) was a German field marshal during World War II who held commands on both the Eastern and Western Fronts. He commanded the 4th Army of the Wehrmacht during the invasion of Poland in 1939 and the Battle of France in 1940, earning a promotion to Generalfeldmarschall. Kluge went on to command the 4th Army in Operation Barbarossa (the invasion of the Soviet Union) and the Battle for Moscow in 1941.

Amid the crisis of the Soviet counter-offensive in December 1941, Kluge was promoted to command Army Group Centre replacing Field Marshal Fedor von Bock. Several members of the German military resistance to Adolf Hitler served on his staff, including Henning von Tresckow. Kluge was aware of the plotters' activities but refused to offer his support unless Hitler was killed. His command on the Eastern Front lasted until October 1943 when Kluge was badly injured in a car accident.

Following a lengthy recuperation, Kluge was appointed OB West (Supreme Commander West) in occupied France in July 1944, after his predecessor, Field Marshal Gerd von Rundstedt, was dismissed for defeatism. Kluge's forces were unable to stop the momentum of the Allied invasion of Normandy, and he began to realise that the war in the West was lost. Although Kluge was not an active conspirator in the 20 July plot, in the aftermath of the failed coup he committed suicide on 19 August 1944, after having been recalled to Berlin for a meeting with Hitler. Kluge was replaced by Field Marshal Walter Model.

Early life and career
Kluge was born on 30 October 1882 in Posen, then in the German state of Prussia (now in western Poland). His father, Max von Kluge, was from an aristocratic Prussian military family. A distinguished commander, Max was a lieutenant general in the German Army who served in the First World War. He married Elise Kühn-Schuhmann in 1881. Günther von Kluge was one of two children, having a younger brother named Wolfgang (1892–1976). Wolfgang served in both world wars, rising to the rank of lieutenant general by 1943, and was commander of Fortress Dunkirk between July and September 1944.

In 1901, Günther von Kluge – sometimes called Hans Günther von Kluge or Der kluge Hans ("Clever Hans") after an alleged performing horse – was commissioned in the German Army's 46th Field Artillery Regiment. He served on the General Staff between 1910 and 1918, reaching the rank of captain on the Western Front during the First World War. He remained in the postwar Reichswehr (national army) following during the Weimar era, becoming a colonel in 1930, major general in 1933, and lieutenant general a year later. On 1 April 1934, Kluge took command of the 6th Division in Münster. In 1935, Adolf Hitler's proclamation of the Wehrmacht – the enlarged German Army – precipitated Kluge's appointment to the 6th Corps and then the 6th Army Group, which subsequently became the 4th Army.

Kluge believed Hitler's "crude militarism" would lead Germany into disaster. During the Sudetenland Crisis, he was a member of a secret anti-war faction lead by Ludwig Beck and Ernst von Weizsäcker, hoping to avoid armed conflict over the disputed territory. The crisis was averted by the Munich Agreement on 30 September 1938. Although he was privately critical of the Nazis, Kluge believed in the principle of Lebensraum and took pride in the rearmament of the Wehrmacht.

World War II

Invasion of Poland
Hitler approved of the German High Command's outline for invading Poland with two army groups during a military briefing on 26–27 April 1939. Kluge's 4th Army was assigned to Army Group North under Fedor von Bock. The Polish campaign commenced on 1 September, taking advantage of the country's long border with Germany. The 4th Army was to advance eastward toward the Corridor from West Pomerania to link with the 3rd Army; the port city of Danzig fell within the first day.

By the following day, apprehensions of a strong Polish defensive line along the Brda River had not materialized. The 4th Army crossed the river, sealing the Polish 9th Infantry Division, 27th Infantry Division, and the Pomeranian Cavalry Brigade in the Corridor. Kluge sent the 10th Panzer Division from his army across the Vistula River, meeting with the 3rd Army on 3 September. The 4th Army's XIX Panzer Corps (Heinz Guderian) captured the city of Brześć on 17 September after three days of fighting in the Battle of Brześć Litewski. Army Group North was informed of the Red Army's invasion of eastern Poland the same day and was directed to remain west of the Bug River. Brześć was turned over to the Soviet forces on 22 September. For his entrapment of Polish forces in the early stages of the invasion, Kluge earned Hitler's praise as one of his most brilliant commanders.

Battle of France

In preparation for Fall Gelb ("Case Yellow"), the invasion of France, Kluge and the 4th Army were transferred to Army Group A under the command of Gerd von Rundstedt. Hitler, still looking for an aggressive alternative to the original plan, approved Erich von Manstein's ideas, known as the Manstein Plan, following a meeting with them on 17 February 1940. The plan outlined that the 4th Army would contribute to an attack through the rugged Ardennes terrain of southern Belgium and Luxembourg to the Meuse River; Kluge entrusted the XV Army Corps, encompassing the 5th and 7th Panzer Divisions, to provide flank cover for Georg-Hans Reinhardt's corps by crossing the Meuse at Dinant.

Launched on 10 May, Case Yellow began successfully. Kluge's corps advanced rapidly, reaching the Meuse in two days. A river crossing, spearheaded by 7th Panzer commander Erwin Rommel, established a bridgehead on the west bank of the Meuse on 13 May and forced the French 9th Army into retreat. Kluge's forces—particularly the 7th Panzer Division—achieved a rapid breakthrough from their bridgehead in the following days; between 16 and 17 May Rommel captured 10,000 prisoners and 100 tanks, and wiped out the remainder of the French 9th Army at the expense of only 35 casualties. Overextended and well ahead of the army group, the 5th and 7th Panzer Divisions fended off a joint British-French counterattack near the town of Arras on 21 May.

After a conference with Hitler and Rundstedt, Kluge issued an order to his Panzer units to halt on 24 May,  from Dunkirk—by then the possible escape route for the British Expeditionary Force. The two-day respite allowed the Allies to consolidate their manpower around Dunkirk and prepare for an evacuation. On 5 June, at the commencement of Fall Rot ("Case Red"), the second phase of the invasion plan, Kluge's 4th Army helped achieve the first breakthrough at Amiens and reached the Seine River on 10 June. Kluge's command and Rommel's generalship throughout the invasion led to his promotion to generalfeldmarschall (field marshal) on 19 July.

Invasion of the Soviet Union

Kluge commanded the 4th Army at the opening of Operation Barbarossa as part of Army Group Centre. In addition to his command, the army group included a field army, the 9th Army, and two mobile formations, the 2nd (Heinz Guderian) and the 3rd Panzer Groups (Hermann Hoth).

On 29 June, Kluge ordered that women in uniform were to be shot, in line with the Nazi ideological worldview. It considered female combatants to be yet another manifestation of "barbaric" Bolshevism where natural gender roles were upended. The order was later rescinded, and women in uniform were to be captured instead. On 4 July, the Oberkommando des Heeres (OKH) ("High Command") subordinated the 2nd and the 3rd Panzer Groups to Kluge, to improve coordination between the fast charging armoured spearheads and the slower infantry. The resulting formation provided unity on paper; in reality, the Panzer group commanders often bristled at Kluge's orders and Guderian and Kluge detested each other personally.   Kluge had to give up all but his two infantry corps; his other corps were assigned to the 2nd Army, which had previously been held in reserve.

Expecting a short war that would not necessitate the exploitation of Soviet labour for the German war effort, the German High Command and military leadership did not make adequate preparations to house prisoners-of-war and civilian internees. In Kluge's area of command, 100,000 POWs and 40,000 civilians were herded into a small open-air camp in Minsk in July 1941. Amid deteriorating conditions and starvation in the camp, Organisation Todt appealed to Kluge to release 10,000 skilled workers. Kluge declined, wishing to make the decisions regarding the prisoners himself.

As part of the Hunger Plan, one of the pillars of the war of annihilation against the Soviet Union, the Wehrmacht was largely expected to "live off the land". Thus looting, pillaging, and abuse of the civilian population was rampant, especially in the areas to the rear. In September 1941, Kluge issued an order to his troops aimed at restoring discipline. It stated that it was "high time to put a complete end to the unjustified methods of obtaining supplies, the raids, the plundering trips over vast distances, all the senseless and criminal activity". Kluge threatened harsh measures against those responsible, along with their superior commanders who failed to maintain discipline.

Battle of Moscow

During Operation Typhoon, the German advance on Moscow, Kluge had the 4th Panzer Group, under the command of Erich Hoepner, subordinated to the 4th Army. In early October, the 4th Panzer Group completed the encirclement at Vyazma. Much to Hoepner's displeasure, Kluge instructed him to pause the advance as his units were needed to prevent break-outs of Soviet forces. Hoepner was confident that clearing the pocket and the advance on Moscow, could be undertaken at the same time. He viewed Kluge's actions as interference, which led to friction and "clashes" with his superior, as he wrote in a letter home on 6 October. Hoepner did not seem to appreciate that his units were very short on fuel; the 11th Panzer Division reported having no fuel at all. Only the 20th Panzer Division was advancing towards Moscow amid deteriorating road conditions.

On 17 November, the 4th Panzer Group again attacked towards Moscow alongside the V Army Corps of the 4th Army, as part of the continuation of Operation Typhoon by Army Group Centre. The panzer group and the army corps represented Kluge's best forces, most ready for a continued offensive. In two weeks' fighting, the German forces advanced  ( per day). A lack of tanks, insufficient motor transport, and a precarious supply situation, along with tenacious Red Army resistance, and the air superiority achieved by Soviet fighters hampered the attack.

Facing pressure from German High Command, Kluge finally committed his weaker south flank to the attack on 1 December. In the aftermath of the battle, Hoepner and Guderian blamed Kluge's slow commitment of the 4th Army's south flank to the attack for the German failure to reach Moscow. Historian David Stahel wrote that this assessment grossly overestimated the capabilities of Kluge's remaining forces. It also failed to appreciate the reality that Moscow was a metropolis, and German forces lacked the numbers to encircle it. With the outer defensive belt completed by 25 November, Moscow was a fortified position which the Wehrmacht lacked the strength to take in a frontal assault. Further attacks were called off on 5 December; the Red Army launched its winter counter-offensive on the same day.

Army Group Centre

After Fedor von Bock was relieved of his command of Army Group Center on 18 December, Kluge was promoted to replace him. Bitter fighting continued in Army Group Center's sector in the winter and early spring, with neither side being able to make much headway. The German forces held, but barely. During the summer campaign of 1942, Case Blue, the army group was to hold its position.

On 30 October 1942, Kluge received a letter of good wishes from Hitler together with a cheque for a half-million Reichsmarks  made out to him from the German treasury. It included a promise that the costs of improving his estate could be billed to the state. This was part of the bribery of senior Wehrmacht officers scheme.
Kluge accepted the money. After severe criticism from his chief of staff, Henning von Tresckow, who upbraided him for corruption, he agreed to meet Carl Friedrich Goerdeler, an opponent of the Nazi regime, in November 1942.
Kluge promised Goerdeler that he would arrest Hitler the next time he came to the Eastern Front. Then after receiving another "gift" from Hitler, he changed his mind and decided to remain loyal.
Hitler, who seems to have heard that Kluge was dissatisfied with his leadership, regarded his "gifts" as entitling him to Kluge's total loyalty.

For much of 1942 and early 1943, Army Group Centre was engaged in positional warfare around the Rzhev salient defending against Red Army offensives, collectively known as the Battles of Rzhev. The Soviet forces gained little ground for their losses, especially in the unsuccessful Operation Mars that commenced around the same time as Operation Uranus, the encirclement of the German forces in the Battle of Stalingrad. Kluge's forces were nevertheless depleted and early in 1943, he obtained authorisation to withdraw the 9th Army (General Walter Model) and elements of the 4th Army (General Gotthard Heinrici) from the salient. The resulting Operation Büffel saw the Wehrmacht abandon the salient in phases between 1 and 22 March 1943. The operation eliminated the Rzhev salient shortening the German lines by  miles. The withdrawal was accompanied by a ruthless scorched-earth and security campaign, resulting in widespread destruction, razing of villages, deportation of the able-bodied population for slave labour, and killings of civilians by the troops of the Wehrmacht under the guise of "anti-partisan warfare".

On 13 March 1943, Hitler authorised several offensives, including one against the Kursk salient. As the last Soviet resistance in the Third Battle of Kharkov petered out, Erich von Manstein, commander of Army Group South, attempted to persuade Kluge to immediately attack the Soviet Central Front, which was defending the northern face of the salient. Kluge refused, believing that his forces were too weak to launch such an attack. By mid-April, amid poor weather and with the German forces exhausted and in need of refitting, the offensives were postponed.

On 15 April, Hitler and the OKH issued a new operational order, which called for the offensive codenamed Zitadelle ("Citadel"), to begin on 3 May or shortly thereafter against the Kursk salient. Operation Citadel, which led to the Battle of Kursk, called for a double envelopment. Army Group Centre was to provide Model's 9th Army to form the northern pincer. Army Group South's 4th Panzer Army and Army Detachment Kempf would drive north to meet the 9th Army east of Kursk. As the planning and preparations continued, in late April Model met with Hitler to express his concerns about strong defensive positions being established by the Red Army in his sector.

Hitler called his senior officers and advisors to Munich for a meeting on 4 May. A number of options were put forth for comment: going on the offensive immediately with the forces at hand, delaying the offensive further to await the arrival of new and better tanks, radically revising the operation or cancelling it altogether. Manstein advocated an early attack but requested two additional infantry divisions, to which Hitler responded that none were available. Kluge spoke out strongly against postponement and discounted Model's reconnaissance materials. General Heinz Guderian, Inspector of Armoured Forces, argued against the operation, stating "the attack was pointless". The conference ended without Hitler coming to a decision, but Citadel was not aborted.

The operation, launched on 5 July, had misfired from the start. In the northern sector, the Soviet forces had completely halted the German advance by 10 July. On 12 July, the Red Army launched Operation Kutuzov, its counter-offensive against the Orel salient, which threatened the flank and rear of Model's 9th Army. On the evening of 12 July, Hitler summoned Kluge and Manstein to his headquarters at Rastenburg in East Prussia, where he announced the cancellation of Citadel. Amid heavy fighting, the Red Army entered Orel on 5 August and, on 18 August, it reached the outskirts of Bryansk, eliminating the Orel salient. With Army Group Center falling back on prepared defensive positions, the German resistance stiffened and it took the Soviet forces until the end of September to liberate Smolensk.

On 27 October 1943, Kluge was badly injured in a car accident. He was unable to return to duty until July 1944. Field Marshal Ernst Busch replaced Kluge as commander of Army Group Centre.

Western Front

In July 1944, Kluge was appointed OB West (Commander of the German Army in the West) after his predecessor, Field Marshal Gerd von Rundstedt, was dismissed for remarking that the war was lost. With the initiative belonging to the Allies, Kluge immediately sought to assert authority over Rommel, in charge of Army Group B and build his command's confidence in defending Normandy. Yet by 12 July, having toured the front and been briefed by field commanders, Kluge expressed his skepticism to Alfred Jodl: "I am no pessimist. But in my view, the situation could not be grimmer". Five days later, Rommel was wounded when a Royal Canadian Air Force (RCAF) Spitfire strafed his staff car, causing the vehicle to veer off the road; Kluge succeeded him in command of Army Group B while retaining his other post.

The Allies drove the Germans from the vital heights of Saint-Lô in July, setting the stage for a major offensive in the Normandy Campaign. Launched on 25 July, Operation Cobra was intended for U.S. forces to take advantage of German armies occupied by British and Canadian attacks around Caen and achieve a decisive breakthrough in northwestern France. By 28 July, the operation succeeded in breaking through German lines, and resistance to the Americans was disorganized. Lacking the resources to hold the front, German units launched desperate counterattacks to escape entrapment, while Kluge sent reinforcements, comprising elements of the 2nd and 116th panzer divisions, westward in hopes of avoiding total collapse; in fierce engagements, his forces suffered heavy losses in men and tanks that he could not replace.

In the last days of July, the German army in Normandy had been reduced to such a poor state by Allied offensives that Kluge could no longer sustain a viable defensive position in Normandy; he had no prospects for reinforcements in the wake of Operation Bagration, the Soviet summer offensive against Army Group Centre, and very few Germans believed they could salvage victory. Between 1 and 4 August, seven divisions from the U.S. Third Army, under Lieutenant General George S. Patton, advanced rapidly through Avranches and over the bridge at Pontaubault into Brittany.

Against Kluge's advice to withdraw, Hitler ordered a counterattack, Operation Lüttich, between Mortain and Avranches. He demanded that all available Panzer units cooperate in a concentrated attack aimed at recapturing the Contentin Peninsula and cutting off U.S. forces in Brittany from resupply. According to OB West Operations Officer Bodo Zimmermann, Kluge knew "very well that carrying out this order meant the collapse of the Normandy front", but his misgiving were ignored. Kluge could only muster four depleted Panzer divisions by the time operations commenced on 7 August. The offensive came to a halt  from Avaranches, primarily due to Allied air superiority, leaving German units vulnerable to entrapment.

A final offensive, Operation Tractable, was launched by Canadian forces on 14 August in conjunction with American advances northward toward Chambois; their goal was to encircle and destroy the German 7th Army and 5th Panzer Army near the town of Falaise. In his final order as OB West commander, Kluge issued a full-scale retreat eastward on 16 August. The Allies did not capture Falaise until later that same day, leaving a -gap between Canadian and American forces—known as the Falaise Gap. By 22 August, the gap—desperately maintained by the Germans to allow their trapped forces to escape—was completely sealed, ending the Battle of Normandy with a decisive Allied victory. As remnants of Army Group B fled eastward, the Allies advanced without opposition through undefended territory. Although perhaps 100,000 Germans managed to escape, 10,000 were killed and another 40,000–50,000 were captured.

Plot against Hitler, and death
Through Carl-Heinrich von Stülpnagel, Kluge was aware of the 20 July plot against Hitler; he agreed to support the conspirators' seizure of power if Hitler was killed. In Paris, the conspirators arrested over 1,200 SS and SD members, and after the assassination attempt failed, Stülpnagel and Caesar von Hofacker met with Kluge at his headquarters in La Roche-Guyon. Having already learned of Hitler's survival, Kluge withdrew his support and rescinded the arrest warrants.

On 15 August, Kluge's car was damaged in an Allied bombing and he was cut off from all contact with his forces for several hours. Hitler immediately suspected Kluge of negotiating with the Allies. He was dismissed two days later and replaced by Model. When he was recalled to Berlin for a meeting with Hitler, Kluge was convinced he had been implicated in the 20 July plot and opted to commit suicide on 19 August using potassium cyanide. In his final testimony, he affirmed his loyalty to Hitler and expressed the view that Germany needed to end the war, writing that "the German people have undergone such untold suffering that it is time to put an end to this frightfulness."

Awards
 Iron Cross (1914) 2nd and 1st class
 Knight's Cross of the House Order of Hohenzollern with Swords
 Clasp to the Iron Cross (1939)  2nd class (5 September 1939) & 1st class
 Knight's Cross of the Iron Cross with Oak Leaves and Swords
 Knight's Cross on 30 September 1939 and commander of the 4th Army
 Oak Leaves on 18 January 1943 as commander of Army Group Center
 Swords on 29 October 1943 as commander of Army Group Center

Notes

Citations

Bibliography

External links
 

1882 births
1944 deaths
German Army World War II field marshals
German military personnel who committed suicide
Lieutenant generals of the Reichswehr
Military personnel from Poznań
People from the Province of Posen
Prussian Army personnel
Recipients of the Knight's Cross of the Iron Cross with Oak Leaves and Swords
Suicides by cyanide poisoning
Recipients of the Iron Cross (1914), 1st class